Raymond Bauwens (04 february 1902) was a sailor from Belgium, who represented his native country at the 1920 Summer Olympics in Ostend, Belgium. Bauwens took the 4th place in the 6 Metre.

References

Sources
 
 

Belgian male sailors (sport)
Sailors at the 1920 Summer Olympics – 6 Metre
Olympic sailors of Belgium
1902 births
1985 deaths